Peter Malcolm Brignall (born 5 July 1953) is the Roman Catholic Bishop of Wrexham.

Born in Whetstone, London on 5 July 1953, he was ordained as a deacon by Victor Guazzelli, Auxiliary Bishop of Westminster in July 1977, and as a priest by Langton Douglas Fox, Bishop of Menevia on 18 February 1978. Nearly nine years later, Brignall was incardinated as a priest of the Diocese of Wrexham on 12 February 1987.

He was appointed the Bishop of the Diocese of Wrexham by the Holy See on 27 June 2012. His consecration to the Episcopate took place at St. Mary's Cathedral, Wrexham on 12 September 2012; the principal consecrator was the Edwin Regan, Bishop emeritus of Wrexham, with Archbishop Antonio Mennini, Apostolic Nuncio to Great Britain and Patrick O'Donoghue, Bishop emeritus of Lancaster serving as principal co-consecrators.

Brignal has amalgamated parishes but his proposed church closure at Conwy has been overruled.

References

1953 births
21st-century Roman Catholic bishops in Wales
Living people
Roman Catholic bishops of Wrexham
Roman Catholic clergy from London